Hat' is a village in Zakarpattia Oblast (province) of western Ukraine. Administratively, the village belongs to the Berehove Raion, Zakarpattia Oblast. Historically, the village was first mentioned as Gath in 1374.

Population
In 1921, the village had a population of 1,967, mostly Hungarians. , the population includes 3,150 inhabitants, of which 3,050 (~96,8 percent) are Hungarians.

References 

Villages in Berehove Raion